The Last Salute is a British comedy television series which first aired on BBC One 15 March 1998 to 29 August 1999. The series follows the misadventures of an AA patrolman in Hampshire in the early 1960s.

Actors who appeared in individual episodes include Christopher Villiers, Hilary Mason, John Junkin, Eva Gray, Lill Roughley, Paul Brooke, Christopher Benjamin, Frances White, and Geoffrey Beevers.

Main cast
 Paul Bown as Harry Thorpe
 Philip Jackson as Leonard Spanwick 
 Jo Unwin as Joyce Thorpe
 Claire Cox as Catherine Heaseman
 Ben Pullen as Robin Pettifer
 David Shane as Roy Munce
 Paul Young as Mr. Bannerman
 Brett Fancy as Johnny Lupus

References

External links
 

BBC television comedy
1998 British television series debuts
1999 British television series endings
1990s British comedy television series
English-language television shows